John Whitehouse may refer to:

 John Whitehouse (cricketer) (born 1949), English cricketer 
 John Whitehouse (footballer) (1878–?), English footballer
 John Whitehouse (poet), poet from England, author of Ode to War
 John Howard Whitehouse (1873–1955), founder of Bembridge School on the Isle of Wight
 John O. Whitehouse (1817–1881), American congressman

See also
 Henry John Whitehouse (1803–1874), second Episcopal bishop of Illinois